Betsey Bayless (born January 10, 1944) was the 16th Secretary of State of Arizona from September 5, 1997, until January 6, 2003. She was appointed to fill the unexpired term of fellow Republican Jane Dee Hull. She was elected to a full term November 3, 1998.

Early life and education
Bayless was born in Phoenix, and is a third generation Arizonan.

Bayless graduated from Xavier High School in 1962. She earned a bachelor's degree in Latin American Studies and Spanish from the University of Arizona, where, as a Phi Beta Kappa, she received the Freeman Medal as outstanding graduate in 1966. She earned her master's degree in public administration at Arizona State University.

Political career
Prior to her appointment as Secretary of State, Bayless was a member of the Maricopa County Board of Supervisors where she served two terms as board chair. Bayless also served as Director of the state Department of Administration, as Acting Director of the state Department of Revenue and as Assistant Director of the Arizona Board of Regents. She ran in 2002 for the Republican nomination for Governor, but came in a distant second to Matt Salmon, who in turn narrowly lost to Janet Napolitano. Bayless was succeeded in office by fellow Republican Jan Brewer

Post-political career
In 2005, Bayless was hired as the chief executive officer for the Maricopa Integrated Health System (MIHS), the public hospital and health care system of Maricopa County. Bayless has been credited with restoring the MIHS to financial viability and expansion of hospital facilities. Following her retirement from the position in 2013, Bayless became president emeritus for the MIHS.

Awards
Bayless received an honorary doctorate from the University of Arizona in 2001.
In 2005, Bayless received the Valley Leadership Woman of the Year Award.

See also

 List of female secretaries of state in the United States

References

External links
 Arizona Secretaries of State timeline
 Arizona Secretary of State biography
 Biodata
 

ASU College of Public Service & Community Solutions alumni
County supervisors in Arizona
Living people
Politicians from Phoenix, Arizona
University of Arizona alumni
Secretaries of State of Arizona
State cabinet secretaries of Arizona
Women in Arizona politics
Women state constitutional officers of Arizona
Arizona Republicans
1944 births
21st-century American women